The Australian Match Play Championship was a golf tournament held in Australia in 1986 and 1992 at Kingston Heath Golf Club, Melbourne. In 1986, the event was contested by 16 players over two days. In 1987, it was played over three days. The field was increased to 24 with eight players receiving a bye to the second round. The final was over 36 holes. In 1989, the field increased to 32 with play over four days. There was one 18-hole round on the first two days, two rounds on the third day and a 36-hole final on the final day. Each year there was also a third-place playoff. Prize money was A$60,000 in 1986, A$100,000 in 1987 and 1988, A$150,000 in 1989 and A$200,000 from 1990 to 1992.

Winners

References

Former PGA Tour of Australasia events
Golf tournaments in Australia
Golf in Victoria (Australia)
Recurring sporting events established in 1986
Recurring events disestablished in 1992